The Latin word lacus means "opening, hole, pool, lake," and was also the word for a distribution point in the public water supply of ancient Rome. It can refer to:

Geography
Lucrinus Lacus, a lake in Campania
Albanus Lake, Lake Albano in Lazio, Italy
Alsietinus Lacus, the ancient name of a lake in Etruria today known as Lake Martignano
Lacus Curtius, a topographical feature in ancient Rome
Lacus Juturnae, a spring and man-made religious structure in ancient Rome

Extraterrestrial 
Lacus may also refer to a lunar mare; see List of maria on the Moon:
Lacus Aestatis
Lacus Autumni
Lacus Bonitatis
Lacus Excellentiae
Lacus Felicitatis
Lacus Mortis
Lacus Solitudinis
Lacus Somniorum
Lacus Spei
Lacus Temporis

Lacus may refer to similar features on other celestial bodies:
Ontario Lacus on Titan, a moon of Saturn
Solis Lacus on Mars

Fictional characters
Lacus Clyne from Mobile Suit Gundam SEED and Mobile Suit Gundam SEED Destiny anime.

Associations
Linguistic Association of Canada and the United States

See also
Lacuna (disambiguation)

Latin words and phrases